Bianca Sorina Marin (born 21 March 1999) is a Romanian handball player who plays for CSM București.

Achievements 
Supercupa României:
Finalist: 2018

References
 

   
1999 births
Living people
Sportspeople from Ploiești
Romanian female handball players